is a district divided between Iburi and Kamikawa Subprefectures in Hokkaido, Japan.

Towns and villages

Iburi Subprefecture
Abira (merger of Hayakita and Oiwake)
Atsuma
Mukawa

Kamikawa Subprefecture
Shimukappu

History
1869 - With the establishment of provinces and districts in Hokkaido, Yūfutsu District, Iburi Province is created
1897 - Placed under Muroran Subprefecture (later renamed Iburi)
1906 - Shimukappu Village transferred to Kamikawa Subprefecture
1948 - Tomakomai City established, leaving Yūfutsu District
On March 27, 2006 - the towns of Hayakita and Oiwake merged to form the new town of Abira.
On March 27, 2006 - the towns of Hobetsu and Mukawa merged to form the new town of Mukawa, now with a different writing.

Districts in Hokkaido